Odorico Leovigildo Saiz Pérez O.F.M. (6 February 1912 – 14 October 2012) was a Spanish Bishop of the Roman Catholic Church. At the age of 100, he was one of oldest bishop in the Church and the oldest Spanish bishop.

Saiz was born in Revilla del Campo, Spain, and ordained a priest on 13 March 1937 of the Order of Friar Minor. He was appointed Apostolic vicar of Requena, Peru on 26 November 1973 as well as Titular bishop of Simingi. Pérez retired as Apostolic vicariate of Requena, Peru on 15 May 1987.

References

1912 births
2012 deaths
20th-century Roman Catholic bishops in Peru
Spanish centenarians
Place of death missing
Spanish Friars Minor
Men centenarians
Roman Catholic bishops of Requena